is a Japanese basketball coach and former professional basketball player. He also played for the Japan men's national 3x3 team.

References

External links
 

1993 births
Living people
Akita Isuzu/Isuzu Motors Lynx/Giga Cats players
Kumamoto Volters players
Levanga Hokkaido players
Japanese men's basketball players
Japan national 3x3 basketball team players
Japanese people of American descent
Rizing Zephyr Fukuoka players
San-en NeoPhoenix players
Tokyo Apache players
Toyama Grouses players
Basketball players from Tokyo